Ebenezer Learned (April 18, 1728 – April 1, 1801) was a brigadier general in the American Continental Army during the Revolutionary War.

Early life and career
He was the son of Ebenezer and Deborah Haynes Learned, and was born at Oxford, Massachusetts, and lived his entire life in the area. On October 5, 1749, he married Jerusha Baker (1732–1799) and they had nine children. When his grandfather died in 1750, he inherited 200 acres (0.8 km2) known as Prospect Hill, and built his home there.

Learned was an active member of the local militia, and raised and drilled a company at Oxford during the French and Indian War. In the summer of 1756 he led his company to Fort Edward at Lake George. There is little record of his service, except that he served sporadically from then until 1763. He fell ill with smallpox in 1757 and was hospitalized for a month.

After that war, he remained at home for several years, farming and operating a tavern at Oxford.  He was prominent in both church and community, and served as a town selectman for 25 of the years between 1758 and 1794.

American Revolution
He remained active in the militia, and led his own and a neighboring company of minutemen to Boston, where he received the news of the Battle of Lexington on April 19, 1775. On April 24, the Massachusetts committee of safety named him a colonel and authorized him to organize a regiment that was known as Learned's Regiment. His regiment was adopted into the Continental Army in June. In 1776 those who re-enlisted were augmented by men from Danielson's Regiment to form the 3rd Continental Regiment.

By the end of the Siege of Boston, General Washington had given Learned command of the important Dorchester Heights position. When the British evacuated Boston on March 17, 1776, Colonel Learned was the first to enter the city. He led a battalion of 500 specially selected men, to clean out the traps, abatis, caltrops, and garbage left by the British. He and the men were selected because they had all had survived smallpox or had been inoculated.

Learned resigned in May 1776 due to ill health, but returned to duty on April 2, 1777.  He was named a brigadier general and assigned to the Northern Department. In the first phase of the Battle of Saratoga, the Battle of Freeman's Farm, his brigade was not very effective. Working forward in the center of the line, they mainly got lost in the woods, and exchanged light fire near the end of the battle.

At the Battle of Bemis Heights his brigade was in the center of the left division, fighting alongside Daniel Morgan and Enoch Poor. They were commanded by General Benjamin Lincoln. Learned's own brigade (the 2nd, 8th, and 9th Massachusetts line), was expanded by James Livingston's 1st Canadian Regiment and 2 regiments of New Hampshire Militia the 2nd and 4th. The attack on the American far left was turned by Daniel Morgan's men, but the enemy's center was held by Hessian troops.   Benedict Arnold came onto the field and encouraged the men. Arnold and Learned led a joint charge on the Hessian positions, and, even though Arnold fell wounded, Learned and his men carried through and broke the enemy lines. Burgoyne's forces had to retreat to their starting fortifications around Freeman's Farm. When their charge carried the first bunker, Burgoyne's forces withdrew to the positions they had held before the Freeman's Farm battle.

After Saratoga, his was the first unit to guard and escort the surrendered Convention Army on its trek to the south. In 1777–78, he commanded a brigade of Massachusetts troops in Major General deKalb's division at Valley Forge. On March 24, 1778, his continuing health problems led to his final resignation.

Later life and activities
Ebenezer returned home to Oxford. He served as the Chairman of the Massachusetts Convention of 1779 that adopted a new constitution for the state. He served as a Judge of Common Pleas for Worcester County, Massachusetts. In 1783 he was elected to the Massachusetts General Court (the state's House of Representatives).

He died at home in Oxford in 1801.

References

Ebenezer Learned at Saratoga
Ebenezer Learned at Valley Forge

1728 births
1801 deaths
Continental Army generals
Continental Army officers from Massachusetts
People of Massachusetts in the French and Indian War
People of colonial Massachusetts
People from Oxford, Massachusetts